The J. M. Gates House is a Bungalow/Craftsman-style house located in Kingman, Arizona. It was evaluated for National Register listing as part of a 1985 study of 63 historic resources in Kingman that led to this and many others being listed.

Description 
The J. M. Gates House is located at 714 East Oak Street in  Kingman, Arizona. The house was built in 1915 in the Bungalow/Craftsman style with the only bungalow with a corner entry. Mr. Gates came to Arizona in 1910, worked at a mercantile store in Chloride, Arizona. In 1915, Gates and local businessmen Allen E. and John Ware started the Central Commercial Company. The store open in 1917, eventually the Gates family owned the business. The family occupied the home until 1952. The house was added to the National Register of Historic Places in 1986.

References

Houses completed in 1917
Houses in Kingman, Arizona
Houses on the National Register of Historic Places in Arizona
National Register of Historic Places in Kingman, Arizona